Zeboim is the name in English of two or three places in the Bible:

 Zeboim, Zeboiim or Tzvoyim was one of the "five cities of the plain" of Sodom, generally coupled with Admah (Gen. 10:19; 14:2; Deut. 29:23; Hos. 11:8). It had a king of its own ("Shemeber", שמאבר, Gen. 14:2), and was therefore a place of some importance. It was destroyed along with the other cities of the plain, according to Deuteronomy 29:23.
 Gē haṣṢāḇoʻim ("Valley of the Hyenas"), a valley or rugged glen somewhere near Gibeah in Benjamin (1 Sam. 13:18). It was probably the place now bearing the name Wadi Shaykh aḍ-Ḍubʻa "Ravine of the Chief of the Hyenas" north of Jericho.
 Ṣāḇoʻim ("Hyenas"), a place mentioned only in the Book of Nehemiah 11:34, inhabited by the Benjamites after the Babylonian captivity.

See also
 Admah – one of the five "cities of the plain"
 Sodom and Gomorrah – two of the five "cities of the plain"
 Zoar, former Bela – one of the five "cities of the plain"

References

Torah cities
Lech-Lecha
Destroyed cities